Andersson Ridge is a ridge,  long, in the southern Eisenhower Range, forming the north wall of Reeves Glacier between the mouths of Anderton Glacier and Carnein Glacier, in Victoria Land. It was mapped by the United States Geological Survey from surveys and from U.S. Navy air photos, 1955–63, and named by the Advisory Committee on Antarctic Names for Lars E. Andersson, a cosmic radiation scientist in the South Pole Station winter party of 1966. The ridge is situated on the Pennell Coast, a portion of Antarctica lying between Cape Williams and Cape Adare.

References 

Ridges of Victoria Land
Pennell Coast